tru. is the third studio album by German rapper Cro. It was released on 8 September 2017 by the hip-hop label Chimperator Productions. The album reached No. 1 of the German and Austrian, and No. 2 of the Swiss album charts.

Track listing
 "Kapitel 1"
 "Fkngrt"
 "Forrest Gump"
 "Tru."
 "Hi"
 "Todas"
 "Baum"
 "Unendlichkeit (Main Edit)"
 "Computiful"
 "No 105."
 "Noch da"
 "Paperdreams"
 "Fake You."
 "Alien"
 "0711"
 "Slow Down"
 "2kx"

Charts

Weekly charts

Year-end charts

Certifications

References

2017 albums
Cro (rapper) albums
German-language albums